In Greek mythology, Acherusia (Ancient Greek: 'Αχερουσια λιμνη or 'Αχερουσις) was a name given by the ancients to several lakes or swamps, which, like the various rivers called Acheron, were at some time believed to be connected with the underworld, until at last the Acherusia came to be considered to be in the lower world itself.

The lake to which this belief seems to have been first attached was the Acherusia in Thesprotia, through which the river Acheron flowed. Other lakes or swamps of the same name, and believed to be in connection with the lower world, were near Hermione in Argolis, near Heraclea in Bithynia, between Cumae and cape Misenum in Campania, and lastly in Egypt, near Memphis.

In Greek mythology, it was also the name of a cavern through which Heracles dragged Cerberus as one of his Twelve Labors.

In Plato's Phaedo, souls are divided into four different categories.  Evil souls are sent to Tartarus; good souls are sent onward to pure places of the world; but neutral souls as well as repentant people who performed great crimes are not immediately sent to their next realm.  Neutral souls are cleansed in the Acherusian Lake before proceeding onward, similar to good souls but slower.  People who committed great evil yet were repentant can hope their victims invite them into Acherusia where they can undergo the cleansing process.

Early Christianity adopted various terms and concepts from Greek mythology, especially among Greek pagans who converted to Pauline Christianity, including the Acherusian Lake, Elysian Fields, and Hades.  The early Greek Christian view seem especially influenced by the fate of the 4th group described by Plato, with Acherusia a place for repentant sinners to be cleansed, possibly at the invitation of those whom they wronged.  The 2nd century Apocalypse of Peter describes how prayers for the dead by saints in heaven would move God to give a post-mortem baptism or washing of damned souls in hell in the Acherusian Lake, allowing them into paradise after a period of cleansing suffering.  The account in the Apocalypse of Peter is quoted in the Sibylline Oracles and several other works.  In the 4th century Apocalypse of Paul, the archangel Michael washes souls in the Acherusian Lake before their entry into the City of Christ in Paradise.  The 3rd to 5th century Apocalypse of Moses features a story where Adam is washed in the Acherusian Lake before being brought to converse with God, presumably to ensure his ritual purity.  The Book of the Resurrection of Jesus Christ, by Bartholomew the Apostle, an 8th-9th century work, features a tour of the afterlife; after the narrator passes through the river of fire (which does not actually harm the godly, for whom it seems like a normal river of water), the angel Michael washes him three times in the Acherusian Lake before proceeding deeper into heaven.

Notes

References 

 Diodorus Siculus, The Library of History translated by Charles Henry Oldfather. Twelve volumes. Loeb Classical Library. Cambridge, Massachusetts: Harvard University Press; London: William Heinemann, Ltd. 1989. Vol. 3. Books 4.59–8. Online version at Bill Thayer's Web Site
 Diodorus Siculus, Bibliotheca Historica. Vol 1-2. Immanel Bekker. Ludwig Dindorf. Friedrich Vogel. in aedibus B. G. Teubneri. Leipzig. 1888–1890. Greek text available at the Perseus Digital Library.
 Pausanias, Description of Greece with an English Translation by W.H.S. Jones, Litt.D., and H.A. Ormerod, M.A., in 4 Volumes. Cambridge, MA, Harvard University Press; London, William Heinemann Ltd. 1918. Online version at the Perseus Digital Library
 Pausanias, Graeciae Descriptio. 3 vols. Leipzig, Teubner. 1903.  Greek text available at the Perseus Digital Library.
Pliny the Elder, The Natural History. John Bostock, M.D., F.R.S. H.T. Riley, Esq., B.A. London. Taylor and Francis, Red Lion Court, Fleet Street. 1855. Online version at the Perseus Digital Library.
Pliny the Elder, Naturalis Historia. Karl Friedrich Theodor Mayhoff. Lipsiae. Teubner. 1906. Latin text available at the Perseus Digital Library.
 Strabo, The Geography of Strabo. Edition by H.L. Jones. Cambridge, Mass.: Harvard University Press; London: William Heinemann, Ltd. 1924. Online version at the Perseus Digital Library.
 Strabo, Geographica edited by A. Meineke. Leipzig: Teubner. 1877. Greek text available at the Perseus Digital Library.

Locations in Greek mythology
Ancient Greek geography
Death in Greek mythology
Fictional lakes
Christian mythology